Schloßberg (Slovene: Gradišče) is a former municipality in the district of Leibnitz in the Austrian state of Styria. Since the 2015 Styria municipal structural reform, it is part of the municipality Leutschach an der Weinstraße. Before World War One, it had an ethnic Slovene majority: according to census of 1910, 50.2% of the population was Slovene speaking, and 49.8% was German speaking.

Population

References

Cities and towns in Leibnitz District